Catharsis is the second studio album by the heavy metal band YOB. It was released in 2003 on Abstract Sounds, and was reissued in 2014 by Relapse Records via vinyl.

Critical reception

Reception to Catharsis was fairly positive. Alex Henderson for AllMusic called the album "enjoyably solid, especially if one has a taste for dark, ominous doom metal." Jim for Punknews.org was another who spoke highly of the album, who in particular praised the guitarwork stating that it "ranges from heavy-as-fuck doom metal to spacey, psychedelic sounding riffs." Chris Ayers for Exclaim! stated that "Yob add a much needed variety to a tired genre, and Catharsis is hopefully just the beginning."

Track listing

Personnel
Music
 Mike Scheidt - vocals, guitars
 Isamu Sato - bass
 Gabe Morley - drums

Production
 Mike Schiedt - mixing
 Laura Jones - photography
 Ed Archer - unknown contribution

References

Yob (band) albums
2003 albums